Line 14 may refer to:

Asia
 Line 14 (Beijing Subway), China
 Line 14 (Guangzhou Metro), China
 Line 14 (Shanghai Metro), China
 Line 14 (Shenzhen Metro), China
 Line 14 (Xi'an Metro), China
 Line 14 (Zhengzhou Metro), China
 Line 14 (Mumbai Metro), India (planned)
 Thomson–East Coast MRT line, number 14, Singapore

Europe
 Line 14 (Moscow Metro), or Moscow Central Circle, Russia
 Line 14 (Stockholm Metro), a Red line, Sweden
 Paris Métro Line 14, France
 Paris Métro Line 14 (1937–76), France
 S14 (ZVV), Zurich, Switzerland

North America
 Line 14 (BMT), now part of New York City Subway service J/Z

South America
 Line 14 (CPTM), São Paulo, Brazil